The Bangladesh President's Gold Cup was an international association football invitational cup competition held between 1981 until 1993. It was hosted and played in Bangladesh and succeeded the Aga Khan Gold Cup which was held in a similar format. The tournament has seen both the national teams and clubs competing.

Winners 
1981: South Korea 2–0 Bangladesh Red

1982: Beijing 4–0 Thailand Youth

1983: Al-Shorta 2–0 Malaysia

1984-85: not held

1986: Vevey Sports 3–2 Turun PS

1987: Syria 4–1 Guangdong

1988: not held

1989: Bangladesh Red 1–1 South Korea University (4–3 pen.)

1990–92: not held

1993: Petrolul Ploiesti 1–0 Polonia Warsaw

See also
Bangladesh Football Federation
Bangladesh Premier League
Bangladesh Championship League
Super Cup
List of Bangladeshi football champions
Football in Bangladesh

References 

Football cup competitions in Bangladesh